El espacio entre las cosas is a 2013 Peruvian experimental fantasy drama film written and directed by Raul del Busto.

Synopsis 
A director prepares a new film, a policeman. The main character is a detective who goes by the name of Glauber Maldonado. Mysterious events changed the life of the detective and that of the director in a diffuse journey between reality and hallucination.

Cast 
The actors participating in this film are:

 Natalia Pena
 Fernando Escribens
 Ricardo Sandi
 Fernando Vilchez
 Ryowa Uehara

Release

Distribution 
The film won the National Contest of Projects of
Distribution of Feature Film awarded by the Ministry of Culture in 2012.

Theatrical release 
The film was commercially released on September 19, 2013, in Peruvian theaters.

Controversy 
A day and a half after the premiere, the functions of the Cineplanet Alcazar cinema chain scheduled for Friday, Saturday and Sunday were suddenly canceled due to "emergency maintenance" (a similar situation happened with The Bad Intentions). Those responsible for the film, Raul del Busto and Cyntia Inamine, expressed their discomfort and discontent with the cinema chain, and also proclaimed that they would denounce Cineplanet for an attempted boycott.

5 days later, the Peruvian Association of Cinematographic Press (APRECI) proclaimed itself against Cineplanet and invoking the authorities to enforce the law.

Awards

References

External links 

 

2013 films
2013 independent films
2013 fantasy films
2013 drama films
Peruvian fantasy films
Peruvian drama films
2010s Spanish-language films
2010s Peruvian films
Films set in Peru
Films shot in Peru
Films about films